Igor Gojić (born 30 July 1984) is a Croatian male canoeist who won two medals at senior level at the Wildwater Canoeing World Championships.

Medals at the World Championships
Senior

References

External links
 Igor Gojić at ICF 

1984 births
Living people
Croatian male canoeists
Place of birth missing (living people)